Gumerovo (Ğümär) is a rural locality (a village) in Kadyrgulovsky Selsoviet, Davlekanovsky District, Bashkortostan, Russia. The population was 40 as of 2010. There is 1 street.

Geography 
Gumerovo is located 44 km southeast of Davlekanovo (the district's administrative centre) by road. Kadyrgulovo is the nearest rural locality.

References 

Rural localities in Davlekanovsky District